The Gurans Himal is a small subrange of the Himalayas in far western Nepal. It is little-known, since it does not contain any 8000 metre peaks, or even any peaks above 7,200 metres. Its highest peak is Api, which, despite its relatively low height compared to the major Himalayan peaks, rises dramatically from a low base, as do the other significant peaks of the Gurans Himal.

Carter's classification of the Himalayas divides the Gurans Himal into two subsections. The Saipal Subsection lies east of the Seti River, and its highest peak is Api, . The Yoka Pahar Subsection lies west of the Seti, and contains Api, ; Jethibahurani, ; Bobaye, ; and Nampa, among other peaks.

References

External links
 Gurans Himal region marked on OpenStreetMap

Mountain ranges of the Himalayas
Mountain ranges of Nepal
Mountains of the Sudurpashchim Province